The national amateur boxing athletes of the Philippines represent the country and compete in regional, continental and international matches and tournaments sanctioned by the International Boxing Association (AIBA). Christopher Cain will be the training and conditioning consultant of the ABAP.

Boxers
1992 Manny Pacquiao began his amateur career with an amateur record of 64(4 - 60 - 0KO )fights before turning pro in 1995.

Olympics

List of medalists

The country has harvested 4 silvers and 4 bronzes in Olympic boxing.

2004 Athens Olympics

Four Filipino boxers attended the 2004 Summer Olympics. Two lost their first bouts while the other two survived until the second rounds. The team's combined record was 2-4.

Entry list
 Harry Tañamor (Light Flyweight)
 Violito Payla (Flyweight)
 Romeo Brin (Light Welterweight)
 Christopher Camat (Middleweight)

2008 Beijing Olympics

One Filipino boxer attended the 2008 Summer Olympics.

Entry list
 Harry Tañamor (Light Flyweight)

List of Philippine National Amateur Boxing Medalists

Men's Edition

List of Olympic Men's medalists

List of AIBA World Boxing Championships medalists

List of AIBA Asian Olympic Qualifying Tournament medalists

(*) Did not qualify for Olympics.

List of Asian Games medalists

List of Asian Amateur Boxing Championships medalists

List of SEA Games medalists

List of AIBA Youth World Championships medalists

World Junior / Youth Championship (17-19 years)

World Cadet / Junior Championship (15-17 years)

Women's Edition

List of Olympic medalists

List of AIBA Women's World Amateur Boxing Championships medalists

List of Asian Games medalists

List of Asian Amateur Boxing Championships medalists

List of SEA Games medalists

List of Asian Indoor Games Medalists

See also
 Association of Boxing Alliances in the Philippines
 List of Olympic medalists for the Philippines

References

Amateur boxing
Boxing in the Philippines
Boxing